For data compression, Signaling compression, or SigComp, is a compression method designed especially for compression of text-based communication data as SIP or RTSP. SigComp had originally been defined in RFC 3320 and was later updated with RFC 4896. A Negative Acknowledgement Mechanism for Signaling Compression is defined in RFC 4077. The SigComp work is performed in the ROHC working group in the transport area of the IETF.

Overview
SigComp specifications describe a compression schema that is located in between the application layer and the transport layer (e.g. between SIP and UDP). It is implemented upon a virtual machine configuration which executes a specific set of commands that are optimized for decompression purposes (namely UDVM, Universal Decompressor Virtual Machine).

One strong point for SigComp is that the bytecode to decode messages can be sent over SigComp itself, so this allows to use any kind of compression schema given that it is expressed as bytecode for the UDVM. Thus any SigComp compatible device may use compression mechanisms that did not exist when it was released without any firmware change. Additionally, some decoders may be already been standardised, so SigComp may recall that code so it is not needed to be sent over the connection. To assure that a message is decodable the only requirement is that the UDVM code is available, so the compression of messages is executed off the virtual machine, and native code can be used.

As an independent system a mechanism to signal the application conversation (e.g. a given SIP session), a compartment mechanism is used, so a given application may have any given number of different, independent conversations, while persisting all the session status (as needed/specified per compression schema and UDVM code).

General architecture

Reference

Related standards documents
  – Signaling Compression (SigComp)
  – Signaling Compression (SigComp) – Extended Operations
  – The Session Initiation Protocol (SIP) and Session Description Protocol (SDP) Static Dictionary for Signaling Compression (SigComp)
  – Compressing the Session Initiation Protocol (SIP)
  – A Negative Acknowledgement Mechanism for Signaling Compression
  – Signaling Compression (SigComp) Users' Guide
  – Signaling Compression (SigComp) Torture Tests
  – Signaling Compression (SigComp) Corrections and Clarifications
  – Applying Signaling Compression (SigComp) to the Session Initiation Protocol (SIP)
  – The Presence-Specific Static Dictionary for Signaling Compression (Sigcomp)
 3GPP TR23.979 Annex C – Required SigComp performance

Data compression
Multimedia
Signal processing
VoIP protocols
Presentation layer protocols